Jean-Maurice Casimir Arvet-Touvet (1841–1913) was a French botanist born in Gières.

His early botanical investigations involved species native to Dauphiné, publishing in 1871 Essai sur les plantes du Dauphiné. Subsequently, he devoted his energies to research of the genus Hieracium (hawkweed). With his friend, Marie Clément Gaston Gautier (1841–1911), he conducted studies of Hieracium found in the Pyrenees and the Iberian Peninsula. With Gautier he issued a 20 booklet exsiccata series of the genus.

During the last few years of his life he was involved with publication of the exsiccata series Hieraciorum praesertim Galliae et Hispaniae catalogus systematicus.

Selected publications 
 Essai sur les plantes du Dauphiné : diagnosis specierum novarum vel dubio praeditarum, 1871.
 Hieracium des Alpes françaises ou occidentales de l'Europe. Lyon, Genève, Bâle : Henri George lib. ; Paris : J. Lechevalier, 1888.
 Hieraciotheca gallica et hispanica in collaboration with Gaston Gautier. Exsiccata en 20 fascicules, 1908.
 Hieraciorum praesertim Galliae et Hispaniae catalogus systematicus. Paris, Lib. des Sc. nat. Léon Lhomme, 1913.

References 
 Museum Grenoble (biography)

External links
 

19th-century French botanists
1913 deaths
1841 births
People from Isère